Patrick Nolen McHale (born November 17, 1983) is an American animator, screenwriter, songwriter, and director.

Known for his work in animation, he served as writer, creative director and storyboard artist for both the television series Adventure Time from 2010 to 2017, and the miniseries Over the Garden Wall in 2014, the latter of which he also created; he also co-wrote the 2022 film Guillermo del Toro's Pinocchio.

Life and career

Early career
McHale graduated from the California Institute of the Arts in 2006 with a BFA in Character Animation. He began his professional career at Cartoon Network Studios in 2007, as writer and storyboard artist on Thurop Van Orman's The Marvelous Misadventures of Flapjack. He helped Van Orman to create ten episodes in total. The one-shot character Punsie McKale was inspired by and modeled after McHale.

After leaving Flapjack, he joined fellow CalArts alum and Flapjack storyboard artist Pendleton Ward to help develop Ward's Adventure Time short into an animated series. Once the show got picked up, McHale stayed on board as the show's creative director through the show's second season. He then moved to New York City with his wife and fellow filmmaker Jiwook Kim. He continued to freelance for the show in the capacity of writing some songs and providing input on story outlines. This lasted until the middle of season five.

Tome of the Unknown and Over the Garden Wall
In October 2011, he started work on the eight-minute animated short Tome of the Unknown, which was produced as part of Cartoon Network's shorts development program. Unlike the other pilots, released online on Cartoon Network Video, the film was selected to be showcased during the festival circuit throughout 2013 and early 2014. It received The Bruce Corwin Award for Best Animated Short Film at the Santa Barbara International Film Festival.

The short became the basis for a ten-part miniseries Over the Garden Wall, which premiered over five consecutive nights in November 2014. Tome of the Unknown was streamed online in May 2015. McHale won a National Cartoonists Society Reuben award as the creator of Over the Garden Wall, in the category for TV Animation. The series won an Emmy Award for Best Animated Program. That same year, McHale's Over the Garden Wall won Best Animated Feature at the Ottawa International Animation Festival.

In 2016, McHale received an Eisner Award for Best Publication for Kids as the creator and a writer of the Over the Garden Wall comic book featuring the characters first appearing in the television series.

Other works
In early 2015, McHale self-published his first short novel, Bags, via Etsy.

In 2015, Frederator Studios announced that McHale would direct an 11-minute adaption of Costume Quest.

On February 22, 2015, McHale released an original album via his Bandcamp page titled The End.

In 2017, director Guillermo del Toro announced that McHale would co-write the script to del Toro's stop-motion adaptation of Pinocchio.

In February 2021, Netflix announced that McHale would serve as scriptwriter for an animated film adaptation of the novel Redwall by Brian Jacques. By December 2022, McHale left the project due to changes at Netflix Animation.

Filmography

Short films
 "Simon and Pig on Holiday" (student film, 2003)
 "Body" (student film, 2004)
 "Candle" (student film, 2005)
 "Apple Bears in the Desert" (2011)
 "Efforts" (2011)
 "Fall Guy" (2011)
 "Tome of the Unknown" (Cartoon Network Studios, 2013)
 "The Zombie" (music video for C. W. Stoneking, 2016)

Films

Television

Internet

References

External links

Patrick McHale's homepage
 

1983 births
Living people
Animators from New Jersey
Annie Award winners
American storyboard artists
American animated film directors
American animated film producers
American filmmakers
American male writers
Creative directors
American television writers
American male television writers
American television producers
American male voice actors
California Institute of the Arts alumni
Cartoon Network Studios people